Seybətin (also, Seybetin and Seyfadyn) is a village and municipality in the Masally Rayon of Azerbaijan.  It has a population of 1,321.

References 

Populated places in Masally District